This is a list of listed buildings in Nordfyn Municipality, Denmark.

The list

5400 Bogense

5450 Otterup

5462 Morud

5471 Søndersø

References

External links

 Danish Agency of Culture

 
Nordfyn